Jefferson County may refer to one of several counties or parishes in the United States, all of which are named directly or indirectly after Thomas Jefferson:

Jefferson County, Alabama
Jefferson County, Arkansas
Jefferson County, Colorado
Jefferson County, Jefferson Territory
Jefferson County, Florida
Jefferson County, Georgia
Jefferson County, Idaho
Jefferson County, Illinois
Jefferson County, Indiana
Jefferson County, Iowa
Jefferson County, Kansas
Jefferson County, Kentucky
Jefferson Parish, Louisiana
Jefferson County, Mississippi
Jefferson County, Missouri
Jefferson County, Montana
Jefferson County, Nebraska
Jefferson County, New York
Jefferson County, Ohio
Jefferson County, Oklahoma
Jefferson County, Oregon
Jefferson County, Pennsylvania
Jefferson County, Tennessee
Jefferson County, Texas
Jefferson County, Virginia, has existed twice; the two counties continue in existence as Jefferson County, Kentucky and Jefferson County, West Virginia
Jefferson County, Washington
Jefferson County, West Virginia
Jefferson County, Wisconsin

See also 
Jefferson County (The Waltons), a fictional county in Virginia
Jefferson Davis Parish, Louisiana
Jefferson Davis County, Mississippi
Jeff Davis County (disambiguation)